William M. Batten (1909–1999) was an American businessman. He served as chairman and chief executive officer of the J. C. Penney Company from 1964 to 1974, and as chairman of the New York Stock Exchange from 1976 to 1984.

Biography

Early life
William Batten was born in Reedy, Roane County, West Virginia on 4 June 1909. He received a Bachelor of Science in Economics from Ohio State University in 1932 and did graduate work at the University of Chicago.

Career
In 1926, he started his career at J. C. Penney as a part-time salesman in his hometown. In 1935, he worked as a full-time salesman in Lansing, Michigan. He introduced the Penney credit card. After serving in the Second World War, he worked in the New York City office of J. C. Penney in 1945. He became vice president in 1953 and a member of the board of directors in 1955. In 1958, he became president and chief executive. He served as chairman from 1964 to 1974.

From 1976 to 1984, he served as chairman of the New York Stock Exchange, taking over from James J. Needham. In this capacity, he oversaw a $70 million renovation of the exchange floor and the installation of electronic equipment that tripled the daily trading capacity to 150 million shares.

He served on the boards of directors of AT&T, Boeing and Texas Instruments. He served as chairman of The Business Council from 1971 to 1972. From 1984 to 1986, he was a visiting fellow at the John F. Kennedy School of Government at Harvard University.

Personal life
He was married, with two children. He died in Hilton Head, South Carolina on January 22, 1999.

Bibliography
The Penney idea: Foundation for the continuing growth of the J. C. Penney Company (1967)

References

1909 births
1999 deaths
People from Parkersburg, West Virginia
New York Stock Exchange people
AT&T people
Boeing people
Texas Instruments people
Harvard Kennedy School faculty
JCPenney
20th-century American businesspeople